Syndyodosuchus is an extinct genus of temnospondyl within the family Actinodontidae. It is known from the Permian Inta Formation of European Russia.

See also
 Prehistoric amphibian
 List of prehistoric amphibians

References

Eryopids
Prehistoric amphibian genera
Fossils of Russia
Permian temnospondyls of Europe
Fossil taxa described in 1956